Dietrich is an ancient German name meaning "Ruler of the People.” Also "keeper of the keys" or a "lockpick" either the tool or the profession.

Given name
 Dietrich, Count of Oldenburg (c. 1398 – 1440)
 Thierry of Alsace (1099–1168), Count of Flanders
 Dietrich of Ringelheim (9th century), Saxon count and father of St Matilda
 Dietrich Bonhoeffer (1906–1945), German Lutheran pastor and theologian
 Wilhelm Dietrich von Buddenbrock (1672–1757), Prussian field marshal and cavalry leader
 Dieterich Buxtehude (c. 1637/39–1707), Danish-German composer and organist
 Dietrich von Choltitz (1894–1966), German General and last commander of Nazi-occupied Paris in 1944
 Dietrich Eckart (1868–1923), German politician
 Dietrich Enns (born 1991), American baseball player
 Dietrich Fischer-Dieskau (1925–2012), German baritone singer
 Dietrich von Hildebrand (1889–1977), German Catholic philosopher and theologian
 Dietrich Hollinderbäumer (born 1942), German-Swedish actor
 Dietrich Mateschitz (1944-2022), Austrian businessman, co-founder of Red Bull
 Dietrich Mattausch (born 1940), German actor 
 Dietrich von Saucken, German general
 Dietrich Stobbe (1938–2011), German politician
 Dietrich Thurau (born 1954), German cyclist
 Dietrich Grunewald (1916–2003), Swedish American artist and designer

Surname
 Albert Dietrich (1829–1908), German composer and conductor
 Albert Gottfried Dietrich (1795–1856), German botanist
 Amalie Dietrich (1821–1891), German naturalist and museum collector
 August Dietrich (1858–?), American politician
 Brandon Dietrich (born 1978), Canadian professional ice hockey player
 Craig Dietrich (born 1980), American digital artist and educator
 Dena Dietrich (1928–2020), American actress
 Derek Dietrich (born 1989), American baseball player
 Fritz Dietrich (1905–1945), German musicologist and composer
 Fritz Dietrich (Nazi) (1898–1948), German Nazi SS officer executed for war crimes
 Guillermo Dietrich (born 1969), Argentine politician
 Jacob Dietrich (1857–1932), American politician
 John H. Dietrich (1878–1957), Unitarian humanist minister
 Klaus Dietrich (born 1974), Austrian footballer
 Louise Dietrich (1878–1962), American nurse
 Marlene Dietrich (1901–1992), German-American actress, singer and entertainer
 Philippe Friedrich Dietrich (1748–1793), French scientist and politician; first mayor of Strasbourg
 Sepp Dietrich (1892–1966), German Waffen-SS general
 Tyler Dietrich (born 1984), Canadian ice hockey coach
 Wilhelm Dietrich (1911–1944), German Waffen SS major
 William E. Dietrich (born 1950), American geomorphologist
 William S. Dietrich II (1938–2011), American industrialist and philanthropist
 Yevgeny Dietrich (born 1973), Russian politician

Fictional characters
 Ian Dietrich, member of the Garrison Regiment in the series Attack on Titan
 Dietrich von Bern, hero of Germanic legend based on Dietrich the Great
 Colonel Dietrich, Nazi colonel in Raiders of the Lost Ark
 Arthur Dietrich, erudite police detective from the ABC sitcom  Barney Miller

Other uses 
 Dietrich, Idaho, United States
 Dietrich, Pennsylvania
 Dietrich Industries
 Dietrich College of Humanities and Social Sciences, at Carnegie Mellon University
 Dietrich School of Arts and Sciences, at the University of Pittsburgh
 Dietrich Inc.

See also 
Derek
Derrick
Detrick
Diderik
Diederich
Diederik
Diedrich
 Dietrich v The Queen, case in the High Court of Australia
Dieter (disambiguation)
Dieterich
Dietrick
Lorraine-Dietrich, French automobile and aircraft engine manufacturer
Theodoric
Thierry (disambiguation)

German masculine given names
German-language surnames
Jewish surnames
Patronymic surnames
Surnames from given names